Kottayam may refer to:
 Kottayam District
 Kottayam city, Kottayam District, Kerala
 Kottayam (Malabar), Malabar District, Kerala
 Kottayam Taluk, Madras Presidency
 Kottayam Town, Madras Presidency